Doris laboutei is a species of sea slug, a dorid nudibranch, a marine gastropod mollusc in the family Dorididae.

Distribution
This species was described from one specimen 15 mm in length (preserved), collected on the Bathus 1 Expedition, stn. CP711, 315-327 m, East of New Caledonia.

References

Dorididae
Gastropods described in 2001